Luigi Barbarito (19 April 1922 – 12 March 2017) was an Italian prelate of the Catholic Church. He held the rank of archbishop while serving as a nuncio in the diplomatic service of the Holy See from 1969 to 1997.

Early life
Born in Atripalda on 19 April 1922, Barbarito studied at the seminary of the Diocese of Avellino and at the Pontifical Seminary of Benevento.

He was ordained a priest on 20 August 1944.

He studied canon law at the Pontifical Gregorian University, graduating in July 1947.

Diplomat
To prepare for a diplomatic career he completed the course of study at the Pontifical Ecclesiastical Academy in 1951. He began his diplomatic career with a posting to Oceania.

On 11 June 1969, Pope Paul VI appointed Barbarito Apostolic Nuncio to Haiti and named him  titular archbishop of Fiorentino. He received his episcopal ordination from the hands of Cardinal Amleto Giovanni Cicognani, with co-consecrators Archbishop Agostino Casaroli and Bishop Pasquale Venezia. 

On 5 April 1975, Pope Paul named him the Apostolic Pro-Nuncio in Niger and Senegal as well as Apostolic Delegate to Mali, Mauritania and Guinea-Bissau. 

On 10 June 1978, Pope Paul appointed him Apostolic Pro-Nuncio to Australia.

On 21 January 1986 Pope John Paul II named him Apostolic Pro-Nuncio to Great Britain. His title changed to Apostolic Nuncio to Great Britain on 13 April 1993. 

Pope John Paul accepted Barbarito's resignation on 31 July 1997.

During his career, he was a member of the Congregation for the Causes of Saints. 

He died on 12 March 2017 in Pietradefusi and was buried in the church of Sant’Ippolisto in Atripalda, the church where he was baptized.

Honours and titles
In 1994 Barbarito became Dean of the Diplomatic Corps in London, the longest-serving foreign diplomat there. Barbarito was appointed an Honorary Knight Grand Cross of the Royal Victorian Order (GCVO) by Queen Elizabeth II in 1996. In December 2013 Barbarito was awarded the title Ecclesiastical Knight Grand Cross of Grace of the Sacred Military Constantinian Order of Saint George, an order which he had been first invested into in 1986.

References

External links
 

1922 births
2017 deaths
People from Avellino
Pontifical Gregorian University alumni
Pontifical Ecclesiastical Academy alumni
Apostolic Nuncios to Haiti
Apostolic Nuncios to Great Britain
Apostolic Nuncios to Niger
Apostolic Nuncios to Guinea-Bissau
Apostolic Nuncios to Mali
Apostolic Nuncios to Mauritania
Apostolic Nuncios to Senegal
Apostolic Nuncios to Australia
20th-century Italian Roman Catholic titular archbishops
Honorary Knights Grand Cross of the Royal Victorian Order